Jean de Brisacier (b. Blois, France, 9 June 1592; d. there, 10 September 1668) was a Jesuit controversialist and opponent of Jansenism. 

He entered the Society of Jesus in 1619; on the completion of his studies, he gave himself to preaching for many years. Afterwards he was in turn Rector of the colleges of Aix, Blois, and Rouen, Visitor to the province of Portugal, Procurator of the Paris Foreign Missions Society and Superior of the Professed House in Paris. His love for missionary work was such that shortly before his death, he remarked that he counted as nothing all the years he had not spent in it. 

Brisacier was an ardent opponent of Jansenism, and never lost an opportunity of attacking it. In a sermon preached at Blois, in 1651, he denounced what he saw as the deceit practiced its adherents, particularly in the district around his native town, where the curé of Cour-Cheverny, M. L'Abbé Callaghan, was very active in promoting it. This gave rise to a spirited controversy. In reply to the Jansenists' answer to his sermon, he repeated his charges, in a publication entitled Le jansénisme confondu dans l'advocat du sieur Callaghan, par le P. Brisacier, avec la deffense de son sermon fait à Blois, le 29 Mars, 1651, contre la response du Port Royal. This work was quickly condemned by Jean François Paul de Gondi, Archbishop of Paris, because of its personal attacks directed especially against the Jansenists of Port-Royal. After this censure the dispute continued for some time, and called forth a long series of pamphlets. As late as 1862, the controversy was kept up by Abbé Pletteau and G. Bordillon.

References

 cites:
Sommervogel, Bibl. de la c, de J., II, 186
Hugo Hurter, Nomenclator, II, 70.

1592 births
1668 deaths
17th-century French Jesuits